Alex or Alexander Potter may refer to:

Alex Potter, character in 3:10 to Yuma (1957 film)
Alex Potter (actor) in Another Life (film)
Alexander Potter (writer) for Sirius: The Dog Star
Alex Potter (countertenor)

See also
Alexandra Potter, British author